Snow White and the Seven Dwarfs is a 1937 American animated musical fantasy film produced by Walt Disney Productions and released by RKO Radio Pictures. Based on the 1812 German fairy tale by the Brothers Grimm, it is the first full-length traditionally animated feature film and the first Disney animated feature film. The story was adapted by storyboard artists Dorothy Ann Blank, Richard Creedon, Merrill De Maris, Otto Englander, Earl Hurd, Dick Rickard, Ted Sears and Webb Smith. David Hand was the supervising director, while William Cottrell, Wilfred Jackson, Larry Morey, Perce Pearce, and Ben Sharpsteen directed the film's individual sequences.

Snow White premiered at the Carthay Circle Theatre in Los Angeles, California on December 21, 1937. Despite initial doubts from the film industry, it was a critical and commercial success and, with international earnings of more than $8 million during its initial release (compared to its $1.5 million budget), it briefly held the record of highest-grossing sound film at the time. The popularity of the film has led to its being re-released theatrically many times, until its home video release in the 1990s. Adjusted for inflation, it is one of the top-ten performers at the North American box office and the highest-grossing animated film. Worldwide, its inflation-adjusted earnings top the animation list.

Snow White was nominated for Best Musical Score at the Academy Awards in 1938, and the next year, producer Walt Disney was awarded an honorary Oscar for the film. This award was unique, consisting of one normal-sized, plus seven miniature Oscar statuettes. They were presented to Disney by Shirley Temple.

In 1989, the United States Library of Congress deemed the film "culturally, historically, or aesthetically significant" and selected it as one of the first 25 films for preservation in the National Film Registry. The American Film Institute ranked it among the 100 greatest American films, and also named the film as the greatest American animated film of all time in 2008. Disney's take on the fairy tale has had a significant cultural effect, resulting in popular theme park attractions, a video game, a Broadway musical, and an upcoming live-action film.

Plot 

Having lost both of her parents at a young age, Snow White is a princess living with her wicked and cold-hearted stepmother, the Queen. Fearing that Snow White's beauty will outshine her own, the Queen forces her to work as a scullery maid and asks her Magic Mirror daily "who is the fairest one of all." For years, the mirror always answers that the Queen is, pleasing her.

One day, the Magic Mirror informs the Queen that Snow White is now the fairest in all of the land. On that same day, Snow White meets and falls in love with a prince who overhears her singing. Angered, the Queen orders her Huntsman to take Snow White into the forest, kill her, and bring back her heart in a jeweled box. The Huntsman cannot bring himself to kill Snow White and reveals to her the Queen's plot. He then urges her to flee into the woods and never return.

Lost and frightened, Snow White is befriended by woodland animals who lead her to a cottage deep in the woods. Finding seven small chairs in the cottage's dining room, Snow White assumes the cottage is the untidy home of seven orphaned children. With the animals' help, she proceeds to clean the place and cook a meal. Snow White soon learns that the cottage is the home of seven dwarfs named Doc, Grumpy, Happy, Sleepy, Bashful, Sneezy, and Dopey, who work in a nearby mine. Returning home, they are alarmed to find their cottage clean, and suspect that an intruder has invaded their home. Snow White introduces herself, and the dwarfs welcome her after she offers to clean and cook for them. Snow White keeps house for the dwarfs while they mine for jewels during the day; and at night, they all sing, play music, and dance.

Back at the castle, the Magic Mirror reveals that Snow White is still living, and with the dwarfs. Enraged that the Huntsman tricked her, the Queen creates a poisoned apple that will put whoever eats it into a death-like sleep. She learns the curse can be broken by "love's first kiss," but is certain Snow White will be buried alive before this can happen. Using a potion to disguise herself as an old hag, the Queen goes to the cottage while the dwarfs are away. The animals see through the disguise, but are unable to warn Snow White; they rush off to find the dwarfs. The Queen fools Snow White into biting into the apple, and she falls into a death-like slumber.

The dwarfs return with the animals as the Queen leaves the cottage, and give chase, trapping her on a cliff. She tries to roll a boulder onto them, but lightning strikes the cliff before she can do so, causing her to fall and get crushed to death by the boulder. In their cottage, the dwarfs find Snow White asleep by the poison. Unwilling to bury her in the ground, they instead place her in a glass coffin in the forest. Together with the animals, they keep watch over her.

A year later, the prince learns of Snow White's eternal sleep and visits the coffin. Saddened by her apparent death, he kisses her, which breaks the spell and awakens her. The dwarfs and animals all rejoice as the prince takes Snow White to his castle.

Cast 

 Adriana Caselotti as Snow White, an optimistic and naive young princess, who, hiding from her stepmother's jealousy, finds shelter in the cottage of the seven dwarfs. For the part of Snow White, Walt Disney was looking for a voice that would sound "away from everyday, as if as from another world". Caselotti was cast in September 1935, although she did her first audition exactly a year before. She got to audition after Disney's casting director telephoned her father, a vocal coach, to get some voice talent references, and Caselotti, having overheard their conversation, picked up the phone to sing and banter in a childlike voice. She was chosen from among more than 150 applicants, among whom was also Deanna Durbin, whose voice sounded too mature to Disney's liking. However, Caselotti's high-pitched voice also caused some misgivings among the animators, with Disney himself admitting that her singing "would irritate". In the course of two years, Caselotti was called in for 44 days of recording sessions. Virginia Davis and Thelma Hubbard also provided miscellaneous vocal tracks for Snow White, such as her screams in the forest flight sequence.
 Lucille La Verne as the Queen, Snow White's envious and obsessive stepmother, who desires to become the "fairest one of all". Disney publications of the 1930s, such as the film's comic strip adaptation, indicate her actual name to be Grimhilde. The studio auditioned dozens of actresses for the role until La Verne was chosen due to her "regal, with a lot of depth" voice. However, several members of Disney's staff felt that her voice was "a little old" for the Queen. Having experience of portraying similar characters in Orphans of the Storm (1921) and A Tale of Two Cities (1935), La Verne also volunteered to voice the Queen's alter ego, the Witch. Initially, the animators were dissatisfied, feeling that her voice was "too smooth and not rough enough" for the part, but La Verne managed to achieve the desired result by removing her false teeth. She also provided some live-action reference for the Witch.
 Roy Atwell as Doc, a self-appointed leader of the seven dwarfs. Story meeting notes from October 9, 1934, describing the dwarfs, indicate that Eddie Holden and Billy Bletcher were initially considered for the role. Atwell was cast in early 1936.
 Pinto Colvig as Grumpy and Sleepy in a dual role
 Otis Harlan as Happy
 Scotty Mattraw as Bashful
 Billy Gilbert as Sneezy 
 Eddie Collins (vocal effects and live-action reference) and Jimmy MacDonald (vocal effects) as Dopey
 Harry Stockwell as the Prince, a young man who falls in love with Snow White. Kenny Baker, who provided vocals for several Silly Symphony shorts, was temporarily considered for the role, until Stockwell was cast in 1936.
 Moroni Olsen as the Magic Mirror, a mystical object from which the Queen learns that Snow White has become the "fairest one of all". Olsen was also among several actors who provided a live-action reference for the Witch.
 Stuart Buchanan as the Huntsman, the Queen's servant, whom she orders to kill Snow White. Reginald Barlow and Cy Kendall initially tried out for the role, but both were found unsatisfactory, and ultimately Buchanan, who was hired in 1936 as studio casting director and vocal coach, was cast.

Production 

In the early 1930s, Walt Disney and his animation studio achieved worldwide recognition due to the success of Mickey Mouse and then-innovative series of animated shorts Silly Symphony. Around the same time, Disney first considered switching to the production of full-length features, believing that short films, despite their popularity, did not bring sufficient profit for the further growth of the studio. He also wanted to expand his storytelling possibilities with more complex plots and character development. In the spring of 1933, Mary Pickford approached Disney with a proposal for a live-action/animated film adaptation of Lewis Carroll's Alice's Adventures in Wonderland, with Pickford herself in the titular role. However, production was quickly scrapped due to Paramount Pictures producing its own film version of Alice at the same time. Paramount's ownership of long-term rights to the original work also prevented Disney from making a live-action/animated film adaptation of Washington Irving's Rip Van Winkle, starring Will Rogers. Disney also considered making a feature film based on Victor Herbert's Babes in Toyland, but it did not work out either due to Hal Roach acquiring rights for his own film adaptation of operetta, featuring Laurel and Hardy.

In spring of 1934, Disney finally decided on Brothers Grimm's fairy tale Snow White, taking inspiration from 1916 silent film version, starring Marguerite Clark, that he saw as a teenager in Kansas City in January 1917. In early June 1934, he announced the production of Snow White and the Seven Dwarfs to The New York Times, estimating that the film could be produced for a budget of $250,000, which was ten times the budget of an average Silly Symphony. Initially, the project, then known as "Feature Symphony", was developed by a small unit that Disney personally supervised, until in late October 1934 he acted out the entire story of Snow White to the rest of his staff, announcing that the film would be produced as a full-length animated film. 

While not the first animated feature film, Snow White and the Seven Dwarfs was to be the first full-length cel animated feature in motion picture history. As such, Walt Disney had to fight to get the film produced. Both his brother and business partner Roy Disney and his wife Lillian attempted to talk him out of it, and the Hollywood movie industry derisively referred to the film as "Disney's Folly" while it was in production. He had to mortgage his house to help finance the film's production, which eventually ran up a total cost of $1,488,422.74, a massive sum for a feature film in 1937. Midway through, Disney needed a $250,000 loan to finish the film. Disney ran a rough cut for Joseph Rosenberg of Bank of America, who sat impassively during the showing. Then Rosenberg turned to the worried Disney and said, “Walt, that thing is going to make a hatful of money” and approved the loan.

Story development 
On August 9, 1934, twenty-one pages of notes—entitled "Snowwhite suggestions"—were compiled by staff writer Richard Creedon, suggesting the principal characters, as well as situations and 'gags' for the story. As Disney had stated at the very beginning of the project, the main attraction of the story for him was the Seven Dwarfs, and their possibilities for "screwiness" and "gags"; the three story meetings held in October and attended by Disney, Creedon, Larry Morey, Albert Hurter, Ted Sears and Pinto Colvig were dominated by such subjects. At this point, Disney preferred to begin actual work on Snow White's discovery of the cottage of the Seven Dwarfs. Disney had suggested from the beginning that each of the dwarfs, whose names and personalities are not stated in the original fairy tale, could have individual personalities. The dwarfs' names were chosen from a pool of about fifty potentials, including Jumpy, Deafy, Dizzey, Hickey, Wheezy, Baldy, Gabby, Nifty, Sniffy, Swift, Lazy, Puffy, Stuffy, Tubby, Shorty, and Burpy. The seven finalists were chosen through a process of elimination. The leader of the dwarfs, required to be pompous, self-important and bumbling, was named Doc; others were named for their distinguishing character traits. At the end of the October story meetings, however, only Doc, Grumpy, Bashful, Sleepy, and Happy of the final seven were named; the other two dwarfs were named Jumpy and "Seventh," who was deaf and spry.

Along with a focus on the characterizations and comedic possibilities of the dwarfs, Creedon's eighteen-page outline of the story written from the October meetings, featured a continuous flow of gags as well as the Queen's attempt to kill Snow White with a poisoned comb, an element taken from the Grimms' original story. After persuading Snow White to use the comb, the disguised Queen would have escaped alive, but the dwarfs would have arrived in time to remove it. After the failure of the comb, the Queen was to have the Prince captured and taken to her dungeon, where she would have come to him (story sketches show this event both with the Queen and the Witch) and used magic to bring the dungeon's skeletons to life, making them dance for him and identifying one skeleton as "Prince Oswald", an example of the more humorous atmosphere of this original story treatment. It is written in story notes that the Queen has such magical power only in her own domain, the castle. With the Prince refusing to marry her, the Queen leaves him to his death (one sketch shows the Prince trapped in a subterranean chamber filling with water) as she makes her way to the dwarfs' cottage with the poisoned apple. The forest animals were to help the Prince escape the Queen's minions and find his horse. The Prince was to ride to the cottage to save Snow White but took the wrong road (despite warnings from the forest animals and his horse, whom he, unlike Snow White, could not understand). He, therefore, would not have arrived in time to save her from the Queen but would have been able to save her with love's first kiss. This plot was not used in the final film, though many sketches of the scene in the dungeon were made by Ferdinand Horvath.

Other examples of the more comical nature of the story at this point included suggestions for a "fat, batty, cartoon type, self-satisfied" Queen. The Prince was also more of a clown and was to serenade Snow White in a more comical fashion. Walt Disney encouraged all staff at the studio to contribute to the story, offering five dollars for every 'gag'; such gags included the dwarfs' noses popping over the foot of the bed when they first meet Snow White.

Disney became concerned that such a comical approach would lessen the plausibility of the characters and, sensing that more time was needed for the development of the Queen, advised in an outline circulated on November 6 that attention be paid exclusively to "scenes in which only Snow White, the Dwarfs, and their bird and animal friends appear". The names and personalities of the dwarfs, however, were still "open to change". A meeting of November 16 resulted in another outline entitled 'Dwarfs Discover Snowwhite', which introduced the character of Dopey, who would ultimately prove to be the most successful of the dwarf characterizations. For the rest of 1934, Disney further developed the story by himself, finding a dilemma in the characterization of the Queen, who he felt could no longer be "fat" and "batty", but a "stately beautiful type", a possibility already brought up in previous story meetings. Disney did not focus on the project again until the autumn of 1935. It was believed that the Silly Symphony short The Goddess of Spring (1934) may have placed doubt in his studio's abilities to animate a realistic girl. Apparently, a three-month trip to Europe that summer restored his confidence. At this point, Disney and his writers focused on the scenes in which Snow White and the dwarfs are introduced to the audience and each other. He laid out the likely assignments for everyone working on the film in a memorandum of November 25, 1935 and had decided on the personalities of the individual dwarfs.

It had first been thought that the dwarfs would be the main focus of the story, and many sequences were written for the seven characters. However, at a certain point, it was decided that the main thrust of the story was provided by the relationship between the Queen and Snow White. For this reason, several sequences featuring the dwarfs were cut from the film. The first, which was animated in its entirety before being cut, showed Doc and Grumpy arguing about whether Snow White should stay with them. Another, also completely animated, would have shown the dwarfs eating soup noisily and messily; Snow White unsuccessfully attempts to teach them how to eat 'like gentlemen'. A partially-animated sequence involved the dwarfs holding a "lodge meeting" in which they try to think of a gift for Snow White; this was to be followed by the elaborate 'bed-building sequence', in which the dwarfs and the forest animals construct and carve a bed for the princess. This was also cut, as it was thought to slow down the movement of the story. The soup-eating and bed-building sequences were animated by Ward Kimball, who was sufficiently discouraged by their removal to consider leaving the studio; Disney, however, persuaded him to stay by promoting Kimball to supervising animator of Jiminy Cricket in his next feature Pinocchio (1940).

Animation 

The primary authority on the design of the film was concept artist Albert Hurter. All designs used in the film, from characters' appearances to the look of the rocks in the background, had to meet Hurter's approval before being finalized. Two other concept artists—Ferdinand Horvath and Gustaf Tenggren—also contributed to the visual style of Snow White and the Seven Dwarfs. Horvath developed a number of dark concepts for the film, although many other designs he developed were ultimately rejected by the Disney team as less easily translated into animation than Hurter's. Tenggren was used as a color stylist and to determine the staging and atmosphere of many of the scenes in the film, as his style borrowed from the likes of Arthur Rackham and John Bauer and thus possessed the European illustration quality that Walt Disney sought. He also designed the posters for the film and illustrated the press book. However, Horvath didn't receive a credit for the film. Other artists to work on the film included Joe Grant, whose most significant contribution was the design for the Queen's Witch form.

Art Babbitt, an animator who joined the Disney studio in 1932, invited seven of his colleagues (who worked in the same room as him) to come with him to an art class that he himself had set up at his home in the Hollywood Hills. Though there was no teacher, Babbitt had recruited a model to pose for him and his fellow animators as they drew. These "classes" were held weekly; each week, more animators would come. After three weeks, Walt Disney called Babbit to his office and offered to provide the supplies, working space and models required if the sessions were moved to the studio. Babbitt ran the sessions for a month until animator Hardie Gramatky suggested that they recruit Don Graham, an art teacher from the Chouinard Institute. Graham taught his first class at the studio on November 15, 1932, and was joined by Philip L. Dike a few weeks later. These classes were principally concerned with human anatomy and movement, though instruction later included action analysis, animal anatomy and acting.

Though the classes were originally described as a "brutal battle", with neither instructor nor students well-versed in the other's craft, the enthusiasm and energy of both parties made the classes stimulating and beneficial for all involved. Graham often screened Disney shorts and, along with the animators, provided critique featuring both strengths and weaknesses. For example, Graham criticised Babbitt's animation of Abner the mouse in The Country Cousin as "taking a few of the obvious actions of a drunk without coordinating the rest of the body", while praising it for maintaining its humour without getting "dirty or mean or vulgar. The country mouse is always having a good time".

Very few of the animators at the Disney studio had had artistic training (most had been newspaper cartoonists); among these few was Grim Natwick, who had trained in Europe. The animator's success in designing and animating Betty Boop for Fleischer Studios showed an understanding of human female anatomy and, when Walt Disney hired Natwick, he was given female characters to animate almost exclusively. Attempts to animate Persephone, the female lead of The Goddess of Spring, had proved largely unsuccessful; Natwick's animation of the heroine in Cookie Carnival showed greater promise, and the animator was eventually given the task of animating Snow White herself. Though live action footage of Snow White, the Prince and the Queen was shot as reference for the animators, the artists' animators disapproved of rotoscoping, considering it to hinder the production of effective caricature. Nevertheless, all of the above-mentioned characters were fully rotoscoped and utilized by their respective artists, some more, some less. Despite Graham and Natwick's objections, however, some scenes of Snow White and the Prince were directly traced from the live-action footage.

It proved difficult to add color to Snow White's and the Queen's faces. Eventually, they found a red dye that worked and which was added with a small piece of cotton wrapped around a tipple pencil on each individual cel. Helen Ogger, an employee at the ink department, was also an animator and decided to use the same system used in animation. The method was so time-consuming that it was never used again on the same scale. It was also used to a smaller degree in Pinocchio and Fantasia but, after Ogger left the studio in 1941, there was no one else with the same skills who could replace her.

The studio's new multiplane camera gave a three-dimensional feeling in many sequences and was also used to give a rotating effect in the scene where the Queen transforms into a witch.

Music and records 

The songs in Snow White and the Seven Dwarfs were composed by Frank Churchill and Larry Morey. Paul J. Smith and Leigh Harline composed the incidental music score. Well-known songs from the film include "Heigh-Ho", "Someday My Prince Will Come", and "Whistle While You Work". Since Disney did not have its own music publishing company at the time, the publishing rights for the music and songs were administered through Bourne Co. Music Publishers, which continues to hold these rights. In later years, the studio was able to acquire back the music rights from many of their other films, but not Snow White, Pinocchio, Dumbo or most Silly Symphony cartoons. Snow White became the first American film to have a soundtrack album, released in conjunction with the feature film. Before Snow White and the Seven Dwarfs, a film soundtrack recording was unheard of and of little value to a movie studio.

Cinematic influences 
At this time, Disney also encouraged his staff to see a variety of films. These ranged from the mainstream, such as MGM's Romeo and Juliet (1936)—to which Disney made direct reference in a story meeting pertaining to the scene in which Snow White lies in her glass coffin—to the more obscure, including European silent cinema. Snow White and the Seven Dwarfs, as well as the two Disney films to follow it, were also influenced by such German expressionist films as Nosferatu (1922) and The Cabinet of Dr. Caligari (1920), both of which were recommended by Disney to his staff. This influence is particularly evident in the scenes of Snow White fleeing through the forest and the Queen's transformation into the Witch. The latter scene was also inspired by Dr. Jekyll and Mr. Hyde (1931), to which Disney made specific reference in story meetings.

Release

Original theatrical run 
Snow White and the Seven Dwarfs premiered at the Carthay Circle Theatre on December 21, 1937. The film received a standing ovation at its completion from an audience that included Judy Garland, Marlene Dietrich and Charles Laughton. Six days later, Walt Disney and the seven dwarfs appeared on the cover of Time magazine. Three weeks later, it opened at the Radio City Music Hall in New York City and a theater in Miami in January 1938, in which the strong box office sales encouraged RKO Radio Pictures to place the film into general release on February 4. It became a major box-office success, earning rentals of $4.2 million in the United States and Canada during its initial release, becoming the most successful sound film of all time, in which it displaced Al Jolson's The Singing Fool (1928). Snow White would soon be displaced from this position by Gone with the Wind in 1939.

Snow White proved equally popular with foreign audiences. In September 1938, Variety reported that the film was having a remarkably long box-office run at theaters in Sydney, Australia. In that city, it noted, "Walt Disney's 'Snow White' (RKO) experienced no difficulty at hitting 11 weeks, with more ahead." Variety reported as well that Snow White was having even longer runs in other cities overseas, such as in London, where the film had generated greater box-office receipts than during its exclusive New York screenings at Radio City Music Hall:

According to RKO, Snow White and the Seven Dwarfs had earned $7,846,000 in international box office receipts by the end of its original theatrical run. This earned RKO a profit of $380,000.

Re-releases 
Snow White and the Seven Dwarfs was first re-released in 1944, to raise revenue for the Disney studio during the World War II period. This re-release set a tradition of re-releasing Disney animated features every few years, and Snow White and the Seven Dwarfs was re-released to theaters in 1952, 1958, 1967, 1975, 1983, 1987 and 1993. Coinciding with the 50th-anniversary release in 1987, Disney released one of many authorized novelizations of the story, this one written by children's author Suzanne Weyn.

In 1993, Snow White and the Seven Dwarfs became the first film to be entirely scanned to digital files, manipulated, and recorded back to film. The restoration project was carried out entirely at 4K resolution and 10-bit color depth using the Cineon system (10 bits each of red, green and blue—30 in total) to digitally remove dirt and scratches.

Snow White and the Seven Dwarfs has had a lifetime gross of $418 million across its original release and several reissues. Adjusted for inflation, and incorporating subsequent releases, the film still registers one of the top-10 American film moneymakers of all time, and is the highest-grossing animated film.

Critical reaction 
The film was a tremendous critical success, with many reviewers hailing it as a genuine work of art, recommended for both children and adults. Although film histories often state that the animation of the human characters was criticized, more recent scholarship found that contemporary reviewers praised the realistic style of the human animation, with several stating that audiences had forgotten that they are watching animated humans rather than real ones. Frank S. Nugent of The New York Times felt that "Mr. Disney and his technical crew have outdone themselves. The picture more than matches expectations. It is a classic, as importantly cinematically as The Birth of a Nation or the birth of Mickey Mouse. Nothing quite like it has been done before; and already we have gone impolite enough to clamor for an encore." Variety observed that "[so] perfect is the illusion, so tender the romance and fantasy, so emotional are certain portions when the acting of the characters strikes a depth comparable to the sincerity of human players, that the film approaches real greatness." Harrison's Reports wrote Snow White was "entertainment that should be enjoyed by every one. Intelligent adults will marvel at the mechanical ingenuity that went into the making of it; and it is something to marvel at, for at times the characters seem lifelike. That is brought about by the expert synchronization of the action with the music and the dialogue."

At the 11th Academy Awards, the film won an Academy Honorary Award for Walt Disney "as a significant screen innovation which has charmed millions and pioneered a great new entertainment field". Disney received a full-size Oscar statuette and seven miniature ones, presented to him by 10-year-old child actress Shirley Temple. The film was also nominated for Best Musical Score. "Some Day My Prince Will Come" has become a jazz standard that has been performed by numerous artists, including Buddy Rich, Lee Wiley, Oscar Peterson, Frank Churchill, and Oliver Jones; it was also the title for albums by Miles Davis, by Wynton Kelly, and Alexis Cole.

Noted filmmakers such as Sergei Eisenstein and Charlie Chaplin praised Snow White and the Seven Dwarfs as a notable achievement in cinema; Eisenstein went so far as to call it the greatest film ever made. The film inspired Metro-Goldwyn-Mayer to produce its own fantasy film, The Wizard of Oz, in 1939. Another animation pioneer, Max Fleischer, decided to produce his animated feature film Gulliver's Travels in order to compete with Snow White. The 1943 Merrie Melodies short Coal Black and de Sebben Dwarfs, directed by Bob Clampett, parodies Snow White and the Seven Dwarfs by presenting the story with an all-black cast singing a jazz score.

Critical re-evaluation and industry recognition 
Snow White and the Seven Dwarfs is referred by many critics as one of the greatest animated films in history. Rolling Stone ranked it as the 4th Greatest Animated Movies ever, calling it the one that “changed the future of animation.” Time magazine ranked the film as the 13th Best Animated films of all time. Harper's Bazaar listed the film as the number one animated film of all time, crediting it as the one that started it all.

In 1987, Snow White was inducted into the Hollywood Walk of Fame, a rare feat for a fictional character and is currently the only Disney Princess to do so.

The American Film Institute (AFI), an independent non-profit organization created in the United States by the National Endowment for the Arts, releases a variety of annual awards and film lists recognizing excellence in filmmaking. The AFI 100 Years... series, which ran from 1998 to 2008, created categorized lists of America's best movies as selected by juries composed from among over 1,500 artists, scholars, critics, and historians. A film's inclusion in one of these lists was based on the film's popularity over time, historical significance and cultural impact. Snow White and the Seven Dwarfs was selected by juries for inclusion on many AFI lists, including the following:

 AFI's 100 Years... 100 Movies – No. 49
 AFI's 100 Years... 100 Movies (10th Anniversary Edition) – No. 34
 AFI's 10 Top 10 – No. 1 Animated film
 AFI's 100 Years... 100 Heroes and Villains: The Queen – No. 10 Villain
 AFI's 100 Years... 100 Songs: "Someday My Prince Will Come" – No. 19

Home media 
On October 28, 1994, the film was released for the first time on home video on VHS and LaserDisc as the first release in the Walt Disney Masterpiece Collection. The LaserDisc edition contained the film along with several bonus material such as a making-of documentary, an archival interview of Walt Disney, and deleted scenes. By 1995, the film had sold 24million home video units and grossed . As of 2002, the film sold 25.1million home video units in the United States.

Snow White and the Seven Dwarfs was released on DVD on October 9, 2001, the first in Disney's Platinum Editions, and featured, across two discs, the digitally restored film, a making-of documentary narrated by Angela Lansbury, an audio commentary by John Canemaker and, via archived audio clips, Walt Disney. It sold a record 1 million copies in 24 hours. A VHS release followed on November 27, 2001. Both versions were returned to the Disney Vault on January 31, 2002. As of 2001, the film grossed a combined  from box office and home video revenue.

Snow White and the Seven Dwarfs was released on Blu-ray on October 6, 2009, the first of Disney's Diamond Editions, and a new DVD edition was released on November 24, 2009. The Blu-ray includes a high-definition version of the movie sourced from a new restoration by Lowry Digital, a DVD copy of the film, and several bonus features not included on the 2001 DVD. This set returned to the Disney Vault on April 30, 2011.

Walt Disney Studios Home Entertainment re-released Snow White and the Seven Dwarfs on Blu-ray and DVD on February 2, 2016, as the first of the Walt Disney Signature Collection line. It was released on Digital HD on January 19, 2016, with bonus material.

Cultural impact and legacy 

Following the film's release, a number of Snow White themed merchandise were sold, including hats, dolls, garden seeds, and glasses. The film's intellectual property has been franchised across a diverse range of mediums, including a Broadway musical, video games and theme park rides.

Snow White's success led to Disney moving ahead with more feature-film productions. Walt Disney used much of the profits from Snow White and the Seven Dwarfs to finance a new $4.5 million studio in Burbank – the location on which The Walt Disney Studios is located to this day. Within two years, the studio completed Pinocchio and Fantasia and had begun production on features such as Dumbo, Bambi, Alice in Wonderland and Peter Pan.

Comics adaptations 
The Silly Symphony Sunday comic strip ran a four-month-long adaptation of Snow White and the Seven Dwarfs from December 12, 1937, to April 24, 1938. The comic was written by Merrill De Maris, and drawn by Hank Porter and Bob Grant. This adaptation was republished several times as a comic book, most recently in 1995.

Mondadori, the official Italian publisher of Disney comics, produced several comic book sequels of the 1937 film. The first story was published in 1939.

Theme parks 

Snow White's Enchanted Wish (named Snow White's Scary Adventures until 2020) is a popular theme park ride at Disneyland (an opening day attraction dating from 1955), Tokyo Disneyland, and Disneyland Paris. Fantasyland at Walt Disney World's Magic Kingdom underwent an expansion from 2012 to 2014. The Snow White's Scary Adventures ride was replaced with Princess Fairytale Hall, where Snow White and other princesses are located for a meet and greet. Included in the 2013 expansion of Fantasyland is the Seven Dwarfs Mine Train roller coaster. Snow White, her Prince, the Queen, and the Seven Dwarfs are also featured in parades and character appearances throughout the parks. Disneyland's Fantasyland Theater hosted Snow White: An Enchanting Musical from 2004 to 2006.

Video games 
Walt Disney's Snow White and the Seven Dwarfs was released for the Game Boy Color system in 2001.
Snow White also makes an appearance in the PlayStation 2 game Kingdom Hearts as one of the seven fabled Princesses of Heart. A world based on the movie, Dwarf Woodlands, appears in Kingdom Hearts: Birth by Sleep for the PSP.
In 2013's free-to-play mobile game Snow White: Queen's Return (also known as Seven Dwarfs: The Queen's Return), an uncanonical continuation of the film, the Queen has survived the fall at the climax of the film and then reverted to her youthful form to cast a curse on Snow White and the dwarfs and their entire forest.
The world builder video game Disney Magic Kingdoms includes Snow White, all the Seven Dwarfs, the Queen and Prince Charming as playable characters, as well as attractions such as Magic Mirror on the Wall, Seven Dwarfs' Cottage, Seven Dwarfs Mine Train, and Snow White's Scary Adventures.

Radio City Music Hall Stage musical 
Snow White and the Seven Dwarfs was the first Disney-produced musical on the New York stage. Unknown Mary Jo Salerno played Snow White in the Disney-produced Snow White and the Seven Dwarfs (televised as Snow White Live!) at the Radio City Music Hall. Music and lyrics for four new songs were created by Jay Blackton and Joe Cook, respectively; titles included "Welcome to the Kingdom of Once Upon a Time" and "Will I Ever See Her Again?". It ran from October 18 to November 18, 1979, and January 11 to March 9, 1980, a total of 106 performances. A cast album was issued by Buena Vista Records.

Canceled prequel 
In the 2000s, DisneyToon Studios began development on a computer-animated prequel to Snow White and the Seven Dwarfs, titled The Seven Dwarfs. Director Mike Disa and screenwriter Evan Spiliotopoulos pitched a story explaining how the Dwarfs met, and how the Evil Queen killed Snow White's father and took the throne. According to Disa, DisneyToon management changed the prequel's plot to center around how Dopey lost his voice upon witnessing the death of his mother. After Disney purchased Pixar in 2006, John Lasseter, DisneyToons' new Chief Creative Officer, canceled The Seven Dwarfs.

Exhibition 
A behind-the-scenes exhibition titled Snow White and the Seven Dwarfs: The Creation of a Classic took place at The Walt Disney Family Museum from November 15, 2012 to April 14, 2013.  The event celebrated the film’s 75th anniversary by displaying more than 200 pieces of rare concept art and animation.  It also detailed the entire story of the film’s production, its release and the worldwide recognition it has earned through the years.
Two extensive companion books, The Fairest One of All: The Making of Walt Disney’s Snow White and the Seven Dwarfs and Snow White and the Seven Dwarfs: The Art and Creation of Walt Disney’s Classic Animated Film were written by J.B. Kaufman and published by Weldon Owen on October 16, 2012.

Live-action adaptation 

In October 2016, a live-action adaptation of Snow White and the Seven Dwarfs was announced. The script will be written by Erin Cressida Wilson; while Benj Pasek and Justin Paul, who also wrote new song material for the 2019 live action adaptation of Aladdin, will write new songs for the project. In 2019, Marc Webb had signed on as director. Principal photography was originally scheduled to begin in March 2020, in Vancouver, but filming was then delayed to the summer or fall of 2020 because of the COVID-19 pandemic. In May 2021, it was reported that Webb was still attached to direct the film but would not begin work on it until later that year, owing to his schedule with the TV series Just Beyond. On June 22, 2021, Rachel Zegler was cast as Snow White, and production was slated to begin in 2022. Filming took place in the United Kingdom, beginning March 2022. Deadline Hollywood reported on November 3, 2021, that Gal Gadot is in final negotiations to portray the Evil Queen. Gadot confirmed her casting during the premiere of the film Red Notice. During that month, it was reported that Greta Gerwig had worked on the most recent draft on the film's script. On January 12, 2022, The Hollywood Reporter reported that Andrew Burnap had been cast in an unspecified "male lead" role, not the prince or huntsman. Peter Dinklage criticized Disney for what he described as "hypocrisy" for being "proud" of casting a Latina actress as Snow White while making a film about "seven dwarfs living in a cave together". Following Dinklage's criticism, Disney announced that the film will use unidentified "magical creatures" in place of them. The film will also simply be titled Snow White due to the absence of the Seven Dwarfs. In March 2022, the set of the film caught on fire at Pinewood Studios just before production began. Filming wrapped in July of that year. During that month, Martin Klebba announced that he would be playing Grumpy.

Other appearances 
The Seven Dwarfs made rare appearances in shorts, despite their popularity; they simply were too numerous to animate efficiently. Commissioned shorts The Standard Parade (1939), The Seven Wise Dwarfs (1941, using mostly recycled footage), All Together (1942) and The Winged Scourge (1943) all include appearances.

The 1984 film Gremlins featured the cartoon in the theater scenes.

The animated television series House of Mouse, which included many Disney character animated cameos, included the characters in the special Mickey's Magical Christmas: Snowed in at the House of Mouse. The Evil Queen appeared in a starring role in the film Once Upon a Halloween as well. In the arena of live action, the fantasy television series Once Upon a Time (produced by Disney-owned ABC Studios) regularly includes live-action interpretations of these characters including Snow White, the Prince, the Evil Queen, and Grumpy.

An animated television series featuring a new version of the seven dwarfs titled The 7D premiered on Disney XD on July 7, 2014, and ended its run on November 5, 2016. The show takes place 30 years before the events of the original film.

In the 2015 Marvel television series Agent Carter episode "The Iron Ceiling", the film was used to teach the children at the Red Room to speak English.

Snow White appears in the 2018 film Ralph Breaks the Internet.

At the end of the 2022 Marvel film Doctor Strange in the Multiverse of Madness, Wanda Maximoff's sons can be seen watching Snow White and the Seven Dwarfs on the television in the living room.

See also 
 List of animated feature-length films
 List of Disney animated features
 List of Disney animated films based on fairy tales

Notes

References

Works cited

External links 

 
 Walt's Masterworks: Snow White and the Seven Dwarfs at Disney.com (archived)
 
  
 
 
 
 
 
 
Streaming audio
 Snow White on Lux Radio Theater: December 26, 1938. Guest appearance by Walt Disney.
 Snow White on Screen Guild Theater: December 23, 1946

 

Snow White (franchise)
1937 animated films
1937 films
1937 children's films
1937 fantasy films
1937 musical films
1930s fantasy adventure films
1930s color films
1930s American animated films
1930s English-language films
American children's animated adventure films
American children's animated fantasy films
American children's animated musical films
American fantasy adventure films
American romantic fantasy films
American animated feature films
Animated films about friendship
Animated romance films
Articles containing video clips
Films about princesses
Films about royalty
Films about shapeshifting
Films about dwarfs
Films awarded an Academy Honorary Award
Films based on Snow White
Films directed by William Cottrell
Films directed by David Hand
Films directed by Wilfred Jackson
Films directed by Larry Morey
Films directed by Perce Pearce
Films directed by Ben Sharpsteen
Films set in mining communities
Films set in the Middle Ages
Films produced by Walt Disney
Films scored by Frank Churchill
Films scored by Leigh Harline
Films scored by Paul Smith (film and television composer)
Poisoning in film
Rotoscoped films
United States National Film Registry films
Walt Disney Animation Studios films
Walt Disney Pictures animated films
Films about witchcraft
1930s romantic fantasy films
1930s children's animated films
Films adapted into comics
Films adapted into plays
Disney Princess films